WOXR (90.9 FM) is a radio station broadcasting a Classical music format. Licensed to Schuyler Falls, New York, United States, the station is currently owned by Vermont Public as the flagship station of the VPR Classical network.

History
The station went on the air as WAVX in November 2004, a contemporary Christian music station owned by Christian Ministries. WAVX was sold to Vermont Public Radio in 2007 to fund upgrades at sister station WGLY-FM (the "Wave" format would subsequently move to a HD Radio subchannel of WGLY). Christian Ministries ended its operation of the station on August 29, with VPR relaunching the station as the flagship station of VPR Classical two days later. The callsign was changed to WOXR, a homage to WQXR-FM in New York City, on September 26.

References

External links

OXR
Radio stations established in 2004
Classical music radio stations in the United States
NPR member stations